International Medical Group (IMG) is a conglomerate of health-related businesses, headquartered in Kampala, Uganda.

History
IMG was founded by Ian Clarke, a physician and businessman born and educated in Northern Ireland but residing in Uganda since 1988. The first company in the group, International Hospital Kampala was established in 1996.

Subsidiaries
The member companies of IMG include:

 International Hospital Kampala (IHK)
 International Health Sciences University (IHSU)
 IAA Healthcare – medical insurance
 International Medical Foundation (IMF) – the group's charitable foundation
 International Medical Centres (IMC) – network of private clinics
 International Diagnostic Centre (IDC) – a referral centre

Ownership
The majority of the stock of IMG is owned by Ian Clarke, the founder of the group. Other minority shareholders include a group based in Mauritius and another minority shareholder group based in the Netherlands.

References

External links 

 

Healthcare companies of Uganda
Kampala District